John Kilpatrick (7 July 1917 – 18 December 1989) was an ice hockey player who played in the English National League (ENL). He also played for the Great Britain national ice hockey team which won the gold medal at the 1936 Winter Olympics (see Ice hockey at the 1936 Winter Olympics). He is a member of the British Ice Hockey Hall of Fame.

Career

Although Kilpatrick was born in Bootle near Liverpool, he learned to play ice hockey in Canada. Kilpatrick played in the 1935–36 and 1936–37 seasons for the Wembley Lions as a checking forward getting limited ice time.

At the age of just 18 years Kilpatrick was selected to play of the GB national team in the 1936 Winter Olympics. He only played in GB's opening game against Sweden, which GB won 1–0. However, this was enough to earn him a gold medal when GB went on to win the tournament. This made Kilpatrick Britain's youngest Winter Olympic gold medallist at the time.

Awards
Olympic gold medalist in 1936.
Inducted to the British Ice Hockey Hall of Fame in 1993.

Footnotes

References
Ice Hockey Journalists UK

External links
British Ice Hockey Hall of Fame entry
Jack Kilpatrick's profile at Sports Reference.com

1917 births
1989 deaths
British Ice Hockey Hall of Fame inductees
English ice hockey left wingers
English Olympic medallists
Ice hockey players at the 1936 Winter Olympics
Medalists at the 1936 Winter Olympics
Olympic gold medallists for Great Britain
Olympic ice hockey players of Great Britain
Olympic medalists in ice hockey
Sportspeople from Bootle
Wembley Lions players